Nicola McGivern (born 7 December 1966) is a British equestrian. She competed in two events at the 2004 Summer Olympics.

References

External links
 

1966 births
Living people
British female equestrians
British dressage riders
Olympic equestrians of Great Britain
Equestrians at the 2004 Summer Olympics
Sportspeople from Stirling